Konobelodon is an extinct genus of amebelodont from southern Europe, China, and North America.

Taxonomy
 
Konobelodon was originally coined as a subgenus of Amebelodon, and was subsequently elevated to full generic rank in a 2014 re-appraisal of "Mastodon" atticus. Within Amebelodontinae, Konobelodon is closely related to Platybelodon and Torynobelodon. The genus Konobelodon likely originated in eastern Eurasia, with K. robustus being known from the Liushu Formation in the Gansu Province of China. Under this hypothesis, it diverged via separate migrations westward into Europe and western Asia, represented by K. atticus, and eastward into North America, where the genus arrived c. 7 Ma and survived until the very end of the Miocene.

Description
As shovel-tusked amebelodonts, Konobelodon has two pairs of tusks, one growing from the upper jaw and a second from the lower. K. robustus is estimated to have had a body mass between 2802 and 7367 kg, making it generally larger than gomphotheres on account of its thicker limb bones. Its standing posture, however, was not likely as column-like as that of extant elephants and American brevirostrine gomphotheres.

Cultural significance

Possible influence on Greek myths 
Konobelodon is among the fossil proboscideans represented in the Miocene-age deposits on the Greek island of Samos, alongside Deinotherium and Choerolophodon. Adrienne Mayor and Nikos Solounias have speculated that these taxa may have influenced local legends of the island's deep history, serving as inspiration for gigantic mythical monsters called Neades, creatures whose voices were believed to cause earthquakes. Mayor and Solounias base their speculation on the fact that the fossils on Samos are found near a major fault zone, suggesting that ancient Greeks may have interpreted the presence of their skeletal remains as being associated with past seismic activity in the region. Ancient sources attest that the bones of these creatures were put on display and that their stories inspired local expressions such as "They shout louder than the Neades!"

Mayor and Solounias also suggest that these fossils may have inspired another story of the god Dionysus waging war with the Amazons on Samos, drawing similar comparisons between the island's geology and a description by Plutarch of this mythic fight. In this story, their skeletal remains are interpreted as belonging to the victims of this ancient war, who like the Neades were able to rend the earth when they cried out in death. They argue that ancient residents of Samos were aware of both the island's fossil record and its geology, and that these stories were early attempts to make sense of the two.

References

Amebelodontidae
Miocene proboscideans
Miocene mammals of North America
Miocene mammals of Asia
Miocene mammals of Europe
Prehistoric placental genera
Tortonian first appearances
Messinian extinctions
Fossil taxa described in 1990